Arianna Neikrug (born 19 April 1993) is an American jazz singer, songwriter, and arranger.

Neikrug was born in Los Angeles, California.

Discography 
 2018: Changes (Concord Jazz)

References

External links 
 

American women jazz singers
American jazz singers
American jazz composers
Living people
1993 births
People from Los Angeles
Jazz musicians from California
21st-century American women